The Imitation Game is a 2014 British-American historical thriller film about British mathematician, logician, cryptanalyst and pioneering computer scientist Alan Turing, a key figure in cracking Nazi Germany's Enigma code that helped the Allies win the Second World War, only to later be criminally prosecuted for his homosexuality. It stars Benedict Cumberbatch as Turing and is directed by Morten Tyldum with a screenplay by Graham Moore, based on the biography Alan Turing: The Enigma by Andrew Hodges.

The film has been nominated for, and has received, numerous awards with Cumberbatch's portrayal of Turing particularly praised. The film and its cast and crew were also honoured by Human Rights Campaign, the largest LGBT civil rights advocacy group and political lobbying organisation in the United States. "We are proud to honor the stars and filmmakers of The Imitation Game for bringing the captivating yet tragic story of Alan Turing to the big screen", HRC president Chad Griffin said in a statement.

Accolades

References

External links
 

Lists of accolades by film